Brian Tevreden (born 17 June 1969) is a Dutch former professional footballer who played as a forward for Eredivisie and Eerste Divisie clubs HFC Haarlem, Stormvogels Telstar, SC Heerenveen and SC Cambuur between 1987 and 2002.

References

1969 births
Living people
Dutch footballers
Footballers from Amsterdam
Association football forwards
HFC Haarlem players
SC Telstar players
SC Heerenveen players
SC Cambuur players
Eredivisie players
Eerste Divisie players